Tetratheca subaphylla, also known as leafless pink-bells, is a species of flowering plant in the quandong family that is endemic to Australia.

Description
The species grows as a straggling or semi-prostrate shrub to 80 cm in length. The leaves are reduced to scales 1–3 mm long. The flowers are deep lilac-pink, with petals 4–10 mm long, appearing from August to February.

Distribution and habitat
The range of the species includes south-eastern New South Wales and East Gippsland in Victoria, where the plants grow on rocky hillsides in eucalypt forest.

References

subaphylla
Flora of New South Wales
Flora of Victoria (Australia)
Oxalidales of Australia
Taxa named by George Bentham
Plants described in 1863